Five Days, Five Nights is a 1996 Portuguese film directed by José Fonseca e Costa, starring Paulo Pires and Vítor Norte. It is based on a novel written by Álvaro Cunhal under the pseudonym Manuel Tiago.

David Stratton of Variety wrote "A languidly paced escape adventure in which suspense potential is abandoned to focus on the relationship between a youthful escapee and his cynical guide, Five Days, Five Nights is a visually impressive but dramatically lightweight affair".

References

External link

1996 drama films
Films produced by Paulo Branco
Golden Globes (Portugal) winners
Portuguese drama films
1990s Portuguese-language films